Billy Odhiambo (born November 7, 1993) is a Kenyan rugby sevens player. He was named in 's squad for the 2016 Summer Olympics in Brazil. He was also selected for the 2014 Commonwealth Games in Scotland.

Odhiambo was part of Kenya's squad in the 2020 Summer Olympics. In 2022, He competed for Kenya at the Rugby World Cup Sevens in Cape Town.

References

External links 
 

1993 births
Living people
Rugby sevens players at the 2016 Summer Olympics
Olympic rugby sevens players of Kenya
Kenya international rugby sevens players
Male rugby sevens players
Kenyan rugby union players
Rugby sevens players at the 2018 Commonwealth Games
Commonwealth Games competitors for Kenya
Rugby sevens players at the 2020 Summer Olympics
People from Nyeri County
Rugby sevens players at the 2022 Commonwealth Games